Hanus Thorleifsson (born 19 December 1985) is a Faroese footballer, currently a free agent. Previously he played for Skála ÍF, HB Tórshavn, ÍF Fuglafjørður, B36 Tórshavn and Giza Hoyvík. Thorleifsson has been capped for the Faroe Islands national football team at senior and junior level.

Club career
Thorleifsson begun his professional career with Skála ÍF in 2002. Until 2006 he played in 68 matches and scored 7 goals with the club in the Faroe Islands Premier League. In November 2005 he transferred to B36 Tórshavn. Thorleifsson was in the starting line-up of B36 in the 2006 Faroe Islands Cup final, where his team won the trophy by winning 2–1 versus KÍ. Following reports about leaving B36, he moved to rivals HB Tórshavn in the summer of 2009.

In January 2013 he moved to ÍF Fuglafjørður. In February 2014 Thorleifsson returned for a second spell in B36, after leaving the club in 2009. In 2015 Thorleifsson helped B36 win back-to-back championships for the first time in the club's history by scoring the winning goal against TB Tvøroyri.

International career
Thorleifsson made his senior debut for the Faroe Islands in a 6–0 away defeat against Scotland, coming in as a substitute for Jónhard Frederiksberg. Totally he has been capped 3 times for the Faroe Islands at senior level.

Honours 
B36 Tórshavn
 Faroe Islands Premier League (2): 2014, 2015, 
 Faroe Islands Cup (1): 2006

HB Tórshavn
 Faroe Islands Premier League (2): 2009, 2010,

References

External links 

Player profile at faroesoccer.com
The full list of Faroe Islands national men's team from the Faroe Islands Football Association 

1985 births
Living people
Faroese footballers
Faroe Islands international footballers
B36 Tórshavn players
Havnar Bóltfelag players
Skála ÍF players
ÍF Fuglafjørður players
Association football midfielders
Faroe Islands youth international footballers